Roales de Campos is a municipality located in the province of Valladolid, Castile and León, Spain. According to the 2004 census (INE), the municipality has a population of 243 inhabitants.

See also
Tierra de Campos

References

Municipalities in the Province of Valladolid
Enclaves and exclaves